Joseph Charles "Joe" Avellone III, M.D. (born September 29, 1948) is an American medical doctor, businessman, and politician from Massachusetts. He was a surgeon at Concord Hospital for four years, selectman for the town of Wellesley, Massachusetts for six years, and was executive vice president for clinical research services at  PAREXEL International. He unsuccessfully sought the Democratic nomination for the 2014 Massachusetts gubernatorial election. (He declared his candidacy for Governor of Massachusetts in January, 2013.)

After completing medical school at Harvard, Avellone joined the United States Navy Reserve, earning the rank of lieutenant commander. He later served as health care advisor to Senator Paul Tsongas during the senator's 1992 Presidential Campaign and on the finance committee for then-Senator John Kerry's 2004 Presidential Campaign. Avellone has also worked as a health care executive since 1991, serving in senior roles in several corporations.

Early life and education
Avellone was born in Fremont, Ohio, to Joseph C. Avellone II, a surgeon at Lutheran Hospital in Cleveland, and Patricia Fox Avellone. He has five siblings.

Avellone moved to New Hampshire to pursue a bachelor's degree from Dartmouth College, where he played rugby and was a member of Sigma Alpha Epsilon fraternity. After completing his undergraduate education in 1970, he attended Dartmouth Medical School for two years. He enrolled in Harvard Medical School for his final two years, and went on to earn a master's degree in public administration from the John F. Kennedy School of Government at Harvard.

In 1979, he was named number 3 in Time magazine's 50 Faces for the Future, along with Bill Clinton, Paul Tsongas, and Jesse Jackson.

Surgical career and military service
After graduation from Harvard Medical School, Avellone did his residency at Peter Bent Brigham Hospital, now known as Brigham and Women's Hospital. He went on to work as a surgeon at Concord Hospital in New Hampshire for four years. In 1979, Avellone joined the Navy Reserve as a member of the Medical Corps.

Avellone is board certified in general surgery  and is a fellow of the American College of Surgeons.

Health industry career
Following his surgical career, Dr. Avellone has worked as a healthcare executive in the Boston Area. He served as chief operating officer of Blue Cross Blue Shield of Massachusetts for seven years. While at Blue Cross, Avellone headed HMO Blue, a health maintenance organization focused on lowering healthcare costs by limiting fees and coordinating care.

He then worked as CEO of biomedical company Veritas Medicine. In 2007 he began working for PAREXEL International, becoming senior vice president for clinical research in 2010, holding that position until October 1, 2013.  He held a small advisory position at PAREXEL.

Political career

Early years
In 1990, Avellone ran successfully for the board of selectmen in the town of Wellesley, Massachusetts. He was sworn in the following year and won reelection five times. During his third term, he served as chairman of the board of selectmen. Two years after his election, Avellone joined Senator Paul Tsongas' Presidential Campaign as a Healthcare Advisor. He has worked on the Presidential Campaigns of John Kerry, Gary Hart, and Edward Kennedy.

2014 Massachusetts gubernatorial campaign

On January 8, 2013, Avellone announced his campaign for Governor of Massachusetts in 2014 when incumbent governor Deval Patrick retires. At the state party convention on June 14, 2014, Avellone failed to receive the 15% of delegate votes required to make the primary ballot.

Personal life
Avellone married Sandy Nabhan in 1975. Joe and Sandy currently live in Wellesley, Massachusetts. They have three children.

References

External links
 
 https://web.archive.org/web/20130809144626/http://www.avelloneforgovernor.com/ – Campaign website
 

1948 births
Living people
21st-century American politicians
American health care chief executives
American surgeons
Businesspeople from Massachusetts
Businesspeople from Ohio
Candidates in the 2014 United States elections
Harvard Kennedy School alumni
Harvard Medical School alumni
Massachusetts Democrats
Massachusetts local politicians
People from Fremont, Ohio
Dartmouth College alumni missing graduation year